Camponotus ephippium is a species of carpenter ant (genus Camponotus) found in Australia. It has two subspecies, "Camponotus ephippium ephippium " and "Camponotus ephippium narses".

References

ephippium
Hymenoptera of Australia
Insects described in 1858